Cochylis sannitica is a species of moth of the family Tortricidae. It is found in Italy.

The wingspan is 11–13 mm. Adults are on wing in July.

References

Moths described in 1995
Cochylis